Steven Patrick Schrage is a former senior G8, White House, State Department, Congressional, and think tank official and academic, who currently heads Delphi Strategy International, a strategic advisory firm. He witnessed the 9/11 attacks on the Pentagon from his seventh floor State Department office and, after evacuating his office in the wake of the attacks, volunteered to oversee international law enforcement efforts in U.S. efforts against terrorism abroad as one of the youngest Deputy Assistant Secretaries of State under Secretary Colin Powell and later as the Co-Chair of the G8’s Anti-Crime and Terrorism Group. Schrage has appeared or provided comments on foreign affairs and politics for major media outlets including NBC Nightly News, Fox News, the BBC, the Washington Post, and the New York Times.

Early life and education 

Steven Schrage was born at Scott Air Force Base in Illinois while his father Dan Schrage was stationed in Europe overseeing MGR-1 Honest John nuclear weapons targeting Communist forces in Eastern Europe and Russia. Schrage’s father graduated from the United States Military Academy, where he was captain of a basketball team that included future U.S. Olympic coaches, point guard Mike Krzyzewski and coach Robert Knight, and later served as an Army Ranger and helicopter pilot in Vietnam.

Schrage moved from Illinois in 1984 when his father became a professor at the Georgia Institute of Technology in Atlanta. He is an honors graduate of North Springs High School, Duke University, and the University of Michigan Law School, where he was also selected to serve in an externship in the State Department’s Office of the Legal Adviser. After college, Schrage worked in a restaurant and bar to save up money and then spent a year backpacking around the world using local transport and interacting with individuals ranging from Chinese students after the Tiananmen square protests to whiskey smugglers riding camels on the border of India and Pakistan. Following several years in government and private sector positions, Schrage began MBA studies at Harvard Business School where he was later awarded a full scholarship to conduct doctoral studies. After earning distinction (honors) on his doctoral qualifying exam and highest marks in all doctoral seminars, Schrage took a leave of absence to serve in the 2000 presidential campaign and government roles noted below. Schrage returned to Harvard in 2012 after he was selected as an Institute of Politics Fellow. In 2019 he completed a PhD in Politics and International Studies at the University of Cambridge, where he received support from Trinity Hall’s Atlantic Fund studentship. He is a life member of the Council on Foreign Relations.

In July 2016, Schrage convened a high-profile conference at the University of Cambridge on the upcoming U.S. presidential election, entitled 2016’s Race to Change the World, which was based on his Harvard and Cambridge research and experience on Campaigns and Foreign Policy. Conference guests included former Secretary of State and UN Ambassador Madeleine Albright; Republican Congressman and presidential campaign adviser Vin Weber; head of Mi6 Sir Richard Dearlove; UK Foreign and Defence Minister Malcolm Rifkind;the BBC’s lead diplomatic correspondent and head of Peterhouse Cambridge Bridget Kendall, and several ambassadors and leading U.S./UK scholars. At the symposium, FISA warrant subject Carter Page met FBI spy Stefan Halper for the first time, which launched the Russian collusion and Spygate controversies. Analysts on both sides of the political spectrum have called this “bigger than Watergate.” Only a few weeks after this conference, the FBI’s controversial Crossfire Hurricane investigation of Trump campaign officials was launched. No allegations of impropriety have been made related to Schrage's involvement in this conference.

Government service and career 

Schrage began government service in the Speaker of the House’s policy office, where he served in a part time position before being selected to work as a Legislative Assistant and later as Counsel to the Western Hemisphere, Narcotics, Terrorism, and the Peace Corps committee for U.S. Senator and former Peace Corps Director Paul Coverdell. During the 2000 presidential campaign, he worked on George W. Bush’s policy team in Austin, Texas and later was selected to serve on Bush’s White House transition team. Schrage was named as the new administration’s first appointee, as Senior Advisor, in the White House’s Cabinet Level Office of the U.S. Trade Representative (USTR) overseeing its operations until a new USTR was confirmed, and later served under the new USTR Robert Zoellick. Schrage later worked on international trade and security issues in Colin Powell’s State Department, where he witnessed the 9/11 attacks and, shortly thereafter, was part of the first senior State Department’s official visit to Israel and Egypt to provide economic support following the attacks. In 2002 he was named Deputy Assistant Secretary for International Narcotics and Law Enforcement (INL), where he oversaw over $2 Billion in assistance and thousands of global personal in key post-9/11 missions including civilian efforts to successfully secure Afghanistan’s first democratic election symbolized by Afghan voters raising blue-painted fingers; global cybercrime and Intellectual Property Rights (IPR) efforts; border security and police training in areas such as Pakistan, Columbia, Mexico, Africa, Europe, and Iraq; and global anti-corruption efforts. Part of his responsibility was to oversee global rule of law and criminal justice efforts, including the work of hundreds of Department of Justice, FBI, DEA and other law enforcement officials placed overseas and a network of International Law Enforcement Academies training foreign law enforcement in criminal, border security, anticorruption and other matters. In this official role, he addressed a UN committee on global crime and terrorism matters after 9/11 and testified before Congress on combatting transnational crime and corruption in Europe. Based on this INL work,  Schrage was also later selected by the White House and State Department to serve as the Co-Chair of the G8’s Anti-Crime and Terrorism Group to lead post-9/11 efforts with the G8 group of world’s leading powers on matters like border security, terrorism, cybercrime, airport/transportation security, and intelligence. In this role, he led U.S. delegations abroad from major U.S. cabinet agencies such as Department of Justice, Homeland Security and Treasury, and co-chaired the U.S. meeting of the Crime and Terrorism group among U.S. allies in 2004.

Schrage later served as International Trade Counsel for the House Ways and Means Committee, where he was the point person for homeland security and border issues, the adoption of new labor and environmental standards in U.S. trade agreements, and for the successful bipartisan passage of several new Free Trade Agreements. In 2007 he was named Foreign Policy and Trade Director for then-Governor Mitt Romney’s presidential campaign and was responsible for working with the candidate and other experts to develop the candidate’s foreign policy and national security positions, speeches, and statements, including Romney’s major foreign policy address hosted by President George H. W. Bush in Texas and his 2008 foreign affairs article laying out Romney 2008 foreign policy vision.

Following the 2008 election, he was selected as the Scholl Chair in International Business at the Center for Strategic and International Studies in Washington DC, a leading global think tank voted as the top international security think tank for eight years running. His work there focused on international economic, security, politics, and strategic issues in the wake of the global financial crisis, and his comments frequently appeared in major media television and newspaper pieces.

During his time at CSIS, Schrage was asked to serve as Chief of Staff for incoming Senator Scott Brown, the first Senator elected during the 2010s Tea Party wave, who became the deciding vote for breaking Senate filibusters between the Republican and Democratic parties, and play a crucial role in legislation including the landmark Dodd Frank reforms. Senator Brown was elected to serve in the seat long held by legendary Massachusetts Senator Ted Kennedy. During the time Schrage was his chief of staff, Senator Brown won praise for his bipartisan actions and, even as a Republican in a heavily democratic state, received some of the strongest approval ratings of any sitting U.S. Senator.

Following his government service, Schrage taught the core curriculum Economics and National Security course at Georgetown’s Graduate School of Foreign Service, which has frequently been ranked as the top International Relations masters program by Foreign Policy magazine’s survey.

References

21st-century American non-fiction writers
21st-century American people
21st-century American male writers
Living people
Duke University alumni
University of Michigan Law School alumni
Harvard Business School alumni
Year of birth missing (living people)